

337001–337100 

|-id=002
| 337002 Robertbodzon ||  || Robert Bodzon (1969–2012), Polish popularizer of astronomy || 
|-id=044
| 337044 Bobdylan ||  || Bob Dylan (Robert Allen Zimmerman, born 1941), a singer and songwriter, has influenced popular music and culture for more than five decades || 
|}

337101–337200 

|-id=166
| 337166 Ivanartioukhov ||  || Ivan Semenovich Artioukhov (1908–1995), founder of the society for nature conservation in Russia and father-in-law of Russian co-discoverer Sergei I. Ipatov || 
|}

337201–337300 

|-bgcolor=#f2f2f2
| colspan=4 align=center | 
|}

337301–337400 

|-id=380
| 337380 Lenormand ||  || Louis-Sébastien Lenormand (1757–1837), a French chemist, physicist and inventor who coined the term parachute and was the first man to make a witnessed descent with one || 
|}

337401–337500 

|-bgcolor=#f2f2f2
| colspan=4 align=center | 
|}

337501–337600 

|-bgcolor=#f2f2f2
| colspan=4 align=center | 
|}

337601–337700 

|-id=700
| 337700 Korpás ||  || Garbiel Korpás (born 1958), a Slovak amateur astronomer and popularizer of astronomy, as well as a member of the astronomy club in Nové Zámky. || 
|}

337701–337800 

|-bgcolor=#f2f2f2
| colspan=4 align=center | 
|}

337801–337900 

|-bgcolor=#f2f2f2
| colspan=4 align=center | 
|}

337901–338000 

|-bgcolor=#f2f2f2
| colspan=4 align=center | 
|}

References 

337001-338000